Goulburn Valley Health, formerly called the Goulburn Valley Base Hospital, is based in the regional city of Shepparton, 2 hours drive north of Melbourne, and caters for the 160,000 people in its region. Goulburn Valley Health is a 300-bed acute and extended care facility which provides surgical, medical, paediatric, obstetrics and gynaecology, intensive care and psychiatry services as well as extended care and regional services. As well as its main site in Graham Street, Shepparton, it has two smaller sites in the nearby towns of Rushworth and Tatura with acute and aged care beds. Goulburn Valley Health also has an affiliation with The University of Melbourne and La Trobe University.

In the year 2003–2004, GV Health -
treated 21,216 acute inpatients
had 28,896 emergency department presentations
had 87,960 outpatient occasions of service
had 969 births
treated 786 mental health patients
had 55 operational residential aged care beds (including specialist mental health beds)

Hospitals in Victoria (Australia)
Hospitals with year of establishment missing
Shepparton